The 2019–20 Lesotho Premier League was the 52nd season of the Lesotho Premier League, the top-tier football league in Lesotho, since its establishment in 1970. The season started on 14 September 2019, and was suspended in March 2020 due to the COVID-19 pandemic in Lesotho, before being abandoned on 16 July. Bantu were declared champions, and no teams were relegated.

Standings
Final table.

Stadiums

References

Football leagues in Lesotho
Lesotho
Lesotho Premier League, 2019-20
2020 in Lesotho sport
2019 in Lesotho sport